Yefremkovskaya is a rural locality (a village) and the administrative center of Pakshengskoye Rural Settlement of Velsky District, Arkhangelsk Oblast, Russia. The population was 281 as of 2014. There are 5 streets.

Geography 
Yefremkovskaya is located 38 km north of Velsk (the district's administrative centre) by road. Artemkovskaya is the nearest rural locality.

References 

Rural localities in Velsky District